Oleg Ichim (born 27 October 1979) is a retired Moldovan professional footballer, who most recently played for Olimpia Elbląg.

External links
 
 
 

1979 births
Living people
Moldovan footballers
Association football defenders
Moldova international footballers
Moldovan expatriate footballers
Expatriate footballers in Belarus
Expatriate footballers in Poland
FC Sheriff Tiraspol players
FC Tiraspol players
CS Tiligul-Tiras Tiraspol players
FC Neman Grodno players
FC Partizan Minsk players
Olimpia Elbląg players
FC Tighina players